The 103rd district of the Texas House of Representatives represents central and eastern Grand Prairie, and a portion of west Dallas. The current Representative is Rafael Anchia, who has represented the district since 2005.

References 

103